Joaquín Arias may refer to:

 Joaquín Arias (baseball) (born 1984), Dominican baseball player
 Joaquín Arias (footballer) (born 1914), Cuban football player